Herbert Hailstone (1850–1896) was an English author and scholar. He grew up in Bottisham, Cambridgeshire, the son of Reverend John Hailstone. He was educated at Eton College before studying at Peterhouse, Cambridge, graduating with a BA in 1873. He was later awarded a Masters in 1879.

Between 1873 and 1876, he was Assistant Master at Eton College. He later worked privately as a tutor in London. He translated several classical works, wrote a poem entitled "The fortunes of Ey Abbey" (c. 1870), and edited the Clergy List between 1889 and 1891.

He committed suicide in Regent's Park in 1896, by cutting his throat.

References

External links
 

1850 births
1896 deaths
People from Bottisham
People educated at Eton College
Alumni of Peterhouse, Cambridge
Suicides by sharp instrument in England
Translators of Homer
Suicides in Westminster
1890s suicides